9,10-Dithioanthracene (DTA) is an organic molecule and a derivative of anthracene with two thiol groups. In 2004 DTA molecules were demonstrated to be able to "walk" in a straight line (reportedly a first ) on a metal surface by, in effect, mimicking the bipedal motion of a human being. The sulfur-bearing functional groups on either side (referred to as "linkers") serve as the molecule's "feet". When the compound is heated on a flat copper surface, the linkers raise up, alternating from side to side, and propel the molecule forward.

During testing at UC Riverside's Center for Nanoscale Science and Engineering, the molecule took about 10,000 unassisted nano-scale steps, moving in a straight line without requiring the assistance of nano-rails or nano-grooves for guidance. As described by one of the researchers, "Similar to a human walking, where one foot is kept on the ground while the other moves forward and propels the body, our molecule always has one linker on a flat surface, which prevents the molecule from stumbling to the side or veering off course." Researchers believe the project could lead to the development of molecular computers in which DTA or other similar molecules would function as nano-abacuses.

References

Thiols
Nanomaterials
Anthracenes